Telipna cuypersi is a butterfly in the family Lycaenidae. It is found in the southern part of the Republic of the Congo, the western part of the Democratic Republic of the Congo and northern Angola.

References

Butterflies described in 2005
Poritiinae